Li Fengping (1912–2008) was a politician of the People's Republic of China. He was born in Tongliang District, Chongqing, which was then part of Sichuan Province. He attended the Central Party School of the Chinese Communist Party in Yan'an, Shaanxi Province. During the Second Sino-Japanese War, he served in the New Fourth Army. He was governor of Zhejiang from 1979 to 1983 and later Chairman of the Zhejiang People's Congress. He was a delegate to the 5th National People's Congress.

References

1912 births
2008 deaths
Governors of Zhejiang
Members of the Central Advisory Commission
Delegates to the 5th National People's Congress
Deputy Communist Party secretaries of Zhejiang